The 2015–16 Senior Women's Cricket Inter Zonal Three Day Game was the second season of India's Inter Zonal women's first-class competition. The tournament took place from 26 February to 16 March 2016.  Five zonal teams participated in the tournament, facing each other in a round-robin format in three-day matches. All matches took place at J Narendranath ACA Cricket Ground, Perecherla and Jagarlamudi Kuppuswamy Choudary College, Guntur. Central Zone won the tournament, their second title in two years.

Squads

Source: BCCI

Competition format
The five teams played in a round-robin league, therefore playing four matches. Matches were played using a three-day format.

The league worked on a points system with positions within the divisions being based on the total points. Points were awarded as follows:

Win: 6 points. 
Tie: 3 points. 
Loss: 0 points.
Drawn (lead after first innings): 3 points 
Drawn (trail after first innings): 1 point 
Drawn (no decision on first innings): 1 point 
Abandoned without a ball bowled: 1 point

If points in the final table are equal, teams are separated by most wins and then by their quotient (runs per wicket for divided by runs per wicket against).

Standings

Source: CricketArchive

Fixtures

Round 1

Round 2

Round 3

Round 4

Round 5

Statistics

Top runs scorers

Highest individual score

Most wickets

Best bowling figures

Source: BCCI

References

2015-16
2015–16 Indian women's cricket
Domestic cricket competitions in 2015–16